Aftersun is a 2022 coming-of-age drama film written and directed by Charlotte Wells, starring Paul Mescal, Frankie Corio and Celia Rowlson-Hall. Set in the late 1990s, the film follows Sophie, an 11-year-old girl, on holiday with her father at a Turkish resort on the eve of his 31st birthday.

Aftersun was released in the United States on 21 October 2022 by A24 and in the United Kingdom on 18 November 2022 by Mubi. The film received acclaim from critics, who praised Wells' direction and screenplay, and the performances of Mescal and Corio, with the former earning a nomination for Best Actor at the 95th Academy Awards. It was also named one of the best films of 2022 by the National Board of Review, received the Outstanding Debut by a British Writer, Director or Producer at the 76th BAFTA awards and was awarded top place by Sight and Sound on its poll for the best films of the year.

Plot
Eleven-year-old Sophie from Edinburgh takes a summer holiday to Turkey with her loving 30-year-old father Calum, who moved to London after having amicably separated from Sophie's mother. Sophie records the holiday on a MiniDV camera, the footage of which is interspersed throughout the film. Over the course of the holiday, Sophie befriends and observes older British teenagers at the Turkish resort, who engage in and discuss sexual and romantic activity. She also meets with and plays arcade games with a boy of her age. Calum is dealing with occupational and financial struggles and exhibits signs of depression and detachment, which he tries to hide from his daughter, keeping up a façade of contentment during the holiday. During his time alone on the holiday, he is seen engaging in Tai chi patterns and reading self-help books; he is also shown smoking, a fact he hides from Sophie.

Despite the young Sophie's observant nature, she is oblivious to the signs of her father's depression. One day, they go scuba diving and she loses her expensive scuba mask to the sea. Calum feigns nonchalance, but Sophie can sense that her father is upset by her mistake and expresses that she understood the mask was expensive and comforts her father. Calum then confesses to the diving instructor next to them that he's surprised that he made it to the age of 30, and is not expecting to make it to 40. Soon after, Calum and Sophie go to a rug merchant and she observes him grapple with the cost of purchasing one he likes. Calum initially declines purchasing the rug while Sophie is with him. He later returns without Sophie and buys it despite the high cost. 

Later that night, they attend a karaoke night and Sophie signs herself and Calum up for a song. Calum curtly refuses to sing with Sophie despite her insistence. Sophie goes on stage and sings "Losing My Religion" alone as Calum watches on. Upset by being left alone by him, Sophie refuses to join Calum in returning to their hotel room and hangs out with the teenagers. She later reunites with the boy, culminating in them sharing a kiss beside a pool. Calum goes to the beach and submerges himself in the beach waters in the darkness of night. Later, Sophie returns to the hotel room where she finds Calum asleep and nude; she gently covers him with a sheet.

The next day, the two reconcile while travelling to the mud baths. Sophie surprises him by having other tourists sing "For He's a Jolly Good Fellow" for his 31st birthday, while Calum stoically watches on. A nude Calum (from the previous night) is then shown sobbing in the hotel room in private, with letters addressed to Sophie on the floor. That night, Calum and Sophie share a dance together to "Under Pressure" in a loving embrace on the last night of their holiday.

Later, Calum and Sophie are at the airport, signalling the end of their holiday. Waving goodbye, Calum sends Sophie off on her flight back home to her mother.

Interspersed throughout the film are rave sequences set in a dark strobe-lit room where a disoriented Calum is seen dancing. An adult Sophie witnesses him from afar dancing frantically. In these sequences, she attempts to get closer to him but fails multiple times. The two are finally able to embrace, hands wrapped around each other, but Calum ultimately falls from the adult Sophie's embrace.

The adult Sophie seen in the rave sequences is the same age as her father during their holiday, with a wife and a small child of her own. Calum is not present in Sophie's life, though the rug he purchased is on display in her apartment. She is shown to be reflecting on the trip to Turkey with her father, by prying through the video camera footage and her own memories, seeking to understand what happened to her father.

The film then concludes with Calum on the day Sophie left him at the airport, packing away the camera, walking down the airport hallway, and opening the doors to the room of the rave.

Cast
 Paul Mescal as Calum
 Frankie Corio as Sophie
 Celia Rowlson-Hall as adult Sophie
 Sally Messham as Belinda
 Brooklyn Toulson as Michael
 Spike Fearn as Olly
 Harry Perdios as Toby
 Ruby Thompson as Laura
 Ethan James Smith as Scott
 Kayleigh Coleman as Jane

Production 
Aftersun is the feature film debut of director and writer Charlotte Wells. Calling it "emotionally autobiographical", she sought to delve into "a different period" in a relationship between a young parent and a daughter than what she explored in her 2015 debut short film Tuesday. Frankie Corio was one of over 800 applicants before being cast. Filming took place in Ölüdeniz, Turkey. During the two-week rehearsal period Corio and Mescal spent time at a holiday resort in order to make their dynamic more authentic.

Release
The film premiered as part of International Critics' Week during the 2022 Cannes Film Festival, where it won a jury prize. It screened at the Edinburgh International Film Festival, the Melbourne International Film Festival, the Telluride Film Festival, the Toronto International Film Festival, the London Film Festival, the New York Film Festival, the Adelaide Film Festival. and the International Film Festival Rotterdam

Aftersun was distributed in Austria, France, Germany, India, Ireland, Italy, Latin America, Spain, Turkey and the United Kingdom by Mubi and in the United States and Canada by A24. It was released in the United States on 21 October 2022 and in the United Kingdom on 18 November 2022.

The film was released for video on demand in the United States on 20 December 2022, and was later made available to stream on Mubi on 5 January 2023 in countries where Mubi distributes the film.

Reception

Critical response

On Rotten Tomatoes, Aftersun holds an approval rating of 96% based on 228 reviews, with an average rating of 8.8/10. The website's critics consensus reads, "Led by Frankie Corio's tremendous performance, Aftersun deftly ushers audiences to the intersection between our memories of loved ones and who they really are." Metacritic assigned the film a weighted average score of 95 out of 100 based on 46 critics, indicating "universal acclaim".

The New York Times critic A.O. Scott described the film as "astonishing and devastating" and commended Wells for "very nearly reinventing the language of film, unlocking the medium's often dormant potential to disclose inner worlds of consciousness and feeling." Screen Dailys Fionnuala Halligan wrote that Wells' "measured but relentless probing ... mark her out as one of the most promising new voices in British cinema in recent years". Guy Lodge of Variety described the film as "sensuous, sharply moving". Carlos Aguilar of TheWrap praised Gregory Oke's "visually fluid" cinematography and thought that it "evokes a radiant melancholia". Writing in Empire, Beth Webb praised the film as being a "deftly orchestrated, empathetic and honest character study" and "A triumph of new British filmmaking."

Several film critics have pointed out the film's resonances with the work of Margaret Tait; as Mark Kermode writes, "There are also clear traces of the films of Margaret Tait in Wells’s craft, specifically Blue Black Permanent (1992), which seems to have served as a tonal reference (a volume of Tait’s writings is prominently displayed on screen)." Charlotte Wells would acknowledge the impact of Tait on her, particularly Blue Black Permanent saying, "It's a special film and it relates in many ways to what I was doing."

Awards and nominations

References

External links
 
 Official screenplay

2022 films
2022 drama films
2022 independent films
2020s American films
2020s British films
2020s English-language films
A24 (company) films
American drama films
BBC Film films
British drama films
English-language Scottish films
Films about father–daughter relationships
Films about vacationing
Films set in Turkey
Films shot in Turkey
Scottish drama films